Mole Beach (Praia Mole) is located in the city of Florianópolis, Brazil. It is up to 120 metres wide and 960 metres long. It is an LGBT tourist spot in Florianópolis.

See also
 Florianópolis Gay Carnival

References

LGBT culture in Brazil
Beaches of Florianópolis